Las Lajas Airport  is a rural airport in the Granada Department of Nicaragua. It serves the agricultural region north of Lake Nicaragua.

See also

 List of airports in Nicaragua
 Transport in Nicaragua

References

Airports in Nicaragua
Granada Department